Jawahar Navodaya Vidyalaya, Hooghly or locally known as JNV Dihibagnan is a boarding, co-educational  school in Hooghly district of West Bengal in India. Navodaya Vidyalayas are funded by the Indian Ministry of Human Resources Development and administered  by Navodaya Vidyalaya Smiti, an autonomous body under the ministry.

History 
The school was founded in 2005, and is a part of Jawahar Navodaya Vidyalaya schools. This school is administered and monitored by Patna regional office of Navodaya Vidyalaya Smiti.

Admission 
Admission to JNV Hooghly at class VI level is made through selection test conducted by Navodaya Vidyalaya Smiti. The information about test is disseminated and advertised by the Hooghly district magistrate (Collector), who is also chairperson of Vidyalya Management Committee.

Affiliations 
JNV Hooghly is affiliated to Central Board of Secondary Education with affiliation number 2440006.

See also 

 List of JNV schools
 Jawahar Navodaya Vidyalaya, North 24 Parganas

References

External links 

 Official Website of JNV Hooghly

Boarding schools in West Bengal
High schools and secondary schools in West Bengal
Hooghly
Schools in Hooghly district
Educational institutions established in 2005
2005 establishments in West Bengal